Knebworth F.C. is an association football club based in Knebworth in Hertfordshire.

History
Knebworth Football Club was formed in 1901. The club were founder members of the North Hertfordshire League in 1910, and were crowned the inaugural Champions.

The club folded in 1995 when their home at the former Kodak Sports & Social Club, now Odyssey Health & Racquet Club, was sold for development.

Knebworth Football Club was reformed in 1999 from an Under 18 squad, which graduated from Knebworth Youth Football Club.

The club began its new chapter in the Hertford and District League, starting out in Division Two. Promotion came in the first season and was followed by the Division One title and a League Cup Final appearance. Two seasons in the premier Division, finishing fourth and then third, prompted a move to the Herts Senior County League.

The third season in Division One of the Herts Senior County League, 2005–06, saw promotion with a third placed finish, while the Reserves also gained promotion in the respective Reserve section. Following three seasons in the top flight of the County League, Knebworth were relegated to Division One at the end of the 2008–09 season.

Honours
Herts County League
Winners: 1973–74
Herts County League Division one
Winners: 1976–77
Herts County League Division 1A
Winners: 1962–63
Herts County League Division Two
Winners: 1952–53

Records
Highest League Position
4th in South Midlands Premier Division: 1984–85 
Best FA Vase Performance
Preliminary Round: 1975–76, 1977–78, 1978–79, 1979–80

References

External links
 Club Website

 
Football clubs in England
Association football clubs established in 1901
1901 establishments in England
Football clubs in Hertfordshire
North Hertfordshire League
Hertford and District Football League
Hertfordshire Senior County League
FC